Tomáš Závorka (born November 26, 1987) is a Czech former professional ice hockey goaltender.

Závorka played 227 games for HC Karlovy Vary in the Czech Extraliga from 2010 until his retirement in 2019.

References

External links

1987 births
Living people
HC Baník Sokolov players
Czech ice hockey goaltenders
Sportovní Klub Kadaň players
HC Karlovy Vary players
HC Most players
People from Sokolov
Piráti Chomutov players
Sportspeople from the Karlovy Vary Region